Giorgio Brogni (born 28 January 2001) is an Italian professional footballer who plays as a defender for  club Ancona, on loan from Atalanta.

Club career
On 16 July 2021, his loan to Feralpisalò was extended for the 2021–22 season. However, he lost his position in the first half of the 2021–22 season to newcomer Niccolò Corrado. 

On 12 January 2022, he moved on a new loan to Paganese. On 9 July 2022, Brogni was loaned to Ancona.

International career
Brogni was a youth international player for Italy between 2017 and 2019.

References

External links

2001 births
Living people
People from Calcinate
Italian footballers
Italy youth international footballers
Association football defenders
Serie C players
Atalanta B.C. players
FeralpiSalò players
Paganese Calcio 1926 players
Ancona-Matelica players
Sportspeople from the Province of Bergamo
Footballers from Lombardy